Conversations I is an album by American jazz saxophonist Roscoe Mitchell, with pianist with Craig Taborn and drummer Kikanju Baku which was recorded in 2013 and released on Wide Hive.

Reception

In his review for Something Else!, S. Victor Allen states, "Conversations I revels in its random, extemporaneous intonations, offering proof that ideas Roscoe Mitchell first put forth in the mid-60's are nowhere near exhausted. It's the kind of album that demands an encore, and wouldn't you know there's one coming: Conversations II"

Regarding Conversations I and II, DownBeat's Bill Meyer commented: "Both of these CDs are remarkably consistent; the engagement and invention never flags, which makes it hard to favor one over the other... Not only is the sound crisp and immaculate, it imparts a spacial experience that makes it feel like the music is happening all around the listener."

Track listing
All compositions by Roscoe Mitchell, Craig Taborn and Kikanju Baku except were noted
 "Knock and Roll" – 8:21
 "Ride the Wind" – 7:38
 "Distant Radio Transmission" – 15:13
 "Rub" – 4:10
 "Who Dat" – 6:37
 "Splatter" – 4:55
 "Cracked Roses" – 6:10
 "Outpost Nine Calling" (Mitchell, Taborn) – 9:12
 "Darse" – 5:53
 "Last Trane to Clover Five" – 9:08

Personnel
Roscoe Mitchell - saxophone, flute
Craig Taborn – piano, organ, synthesizer
Kikanju Baku – drums, percussion

References

2014 albums
Roscoe Mitchell albums
Wide Hive Records albums